Émile is an 1827 autobiographical novel by Émile de Girardin, based on Girardin's early life.

1827 French novels
French autobiographical novels